Main Nashe Mein Hoon is a 1959 Hindi film directed by Naresh Saigal with Raj Kapoor and Mala Sinha in the lead roles.

Plot

Belonging to a family that has a grandfather addicted to alcohol, Mohan Khanna (Raj Kapoor) too is addicted to alcohol, compounded by the fact that he is enamoured with a woman, Miss Reeta (Nishi), who is using him to extort money and vengeance from his Judge father, Kundan Lal Khanna. The only person who is really interested in the welfare of Mohan, in a practical way, is an aged and recently hired servant of the family, who has just been released from prison for killing two people.

Cast
The cast of the film is:

Music
Lyrics were by Shailendra (lyricist), Hasrat Jaipuri & Mirza Ghalib

External links

References

1959 films
1950s Hindi-language films
Films scored by Shankar–Jaikishan